The Edmond Sun was a daily newspaper serving the Edmond and Deer Creek communities. The Edmond Sun was owned by Community Newspaper Holdings Inc.

History 
The newspaper was founded in 1889.

On May 6, 2020, The Edmond Sun merged into The Norman Transcript.

References

Defunct newspapers published in Oklahoma
Edmond, Oklahoma
Newspapers established in 1889
Publications disestablished in 2020
2020 disestablishments in Oklahoma